The 1962 Bulgarian Cup Final was the 22nd final of the Bulgarian Cup (in this period the tournament was named Cup of the Soviet Army), and was contested between Botev Plovdiv and Dunav Ruse on 12 August 1962 at Vasil Levski National Stadium in Sofia. Botev won the final 3–0.

Match

Details

See also
1961–62 A Group

References

Bulgarian Cup finals
Botev Plovdiv matches
Cup Final